Segments is a jazz album by pianist Geri Allen, bassist Charlie Haden and drummer Paul Motian recorded in 1989 and released on the Japanese DIW label.

Reception 

AllMusic awarded the album 4 stars, stating, "At the time, the trio performed and recorded frequently, and the collaborative energy they shared is palpable on this album". The Penguin Guide to Jazz praised the contribution of all members of the trio, and added that "Allen can't entirely claim ownership".

Track listing
All compositions by Paul Motian except as indicated
 "Law Years" (Ornette Coleman) – 5:46
 "You'll Never Know" (Harry Warren) – 5:00
 "Marmaduke" (Charlie Parker) – 4:42
 "Cabala/Drum Music" – 7:39
 "Home" – 1:30
 "I'm All Smiles" (Michael Leonard) – 6:02
 "Segment" (Parker) – 4:26
 "La Pasionara" (Charlie Haden) – 9:25
 "Rain" (Geri Allen) – 3:35

Personnel 
Geri Allen – piano
Charlie Haden – bass 
Paul Motian – drums

References 

1989 albums
Geri Allen albums
DIW Records albums
Charlie Haden albums
Paul Motian albums
Collaborative albums